Lynda Chalker, Baroness Chalker of Wallasey,  (born 29 April 1942) is a British retired Conservative politician who was the Member of Parliament for Wallasey from 1974 to 1992. She served as Minister of State for Overseas Development and Africa at the Foreign Office, in the Conservative government from 1989 to 1997.

Chalker headed the British delegation which participated in the first Tokyo International Conference on African Development in October 1993.

She jointly holds the 20th-century record for continuous government service, along with Kenneth Clarke, Malcolm Rifkind, Tony Newton and Patrick Mayhew, as she held office for the entire duration of the Conservatives' 18 years in power.

Chalker is the former president of the Royal Geographical Society.

Early life and career

Chalker was educated at Roedean (where she was head girl), Heidelberg University, Queen Mary University of London and the University of Westminster (then known as the Polytechnic of Central London), and worked as a statistician and market researcher, including spells with Shell-Mex and BP and Opinion Research Centre (ORC), before entering Parliament as MP for Wallasey, Merseyside in 1974, succeeding the former Cabinet minister Ernest Marples.

Chalker held a number of government posts, including spells as Parliamentary Under-Secretary of State at the Department of Health and Social Security from 1979 to 1982 and at the Department of Transport from 1982 to 1983. In 1983 she became Minister of State at Transport, being appointed Minister for Europe in 1986. However, she was never promoted to a member of Cabinet. Gillian Shephard argued that Prime Minister Margaret Thatcher should have promoted Chalker to Cabinet, saying, "Lynda had a very senior position as a sort of Deputy Foreign Secretary, and she had worked a lot on her own developing policy on Africa and elsewhere. She was a serious player, loyal to a fault and never put her foot in it - a first class woman." When asked, Chalker said that she believed she was overlooked because Thatcher wanted to be the only woman in Cabinet.

Post-Commons

Chalker was granted a life peerage as Baroness Chalker of Wallasey, of Leigh-on-Sea in the County of Essex in 1992, after losing her seat at the general election of that year.

Chalker is the founder and president of Africa Matters Limited, an independent consultancy providing advice and assistance to companies initiating, developing or growing their activities in Africa. She is a member of the international advisory board of Lafarge and sits on the board of trustees of the Investment Climate Facility for Africa.

She is a consultant for Uganda's Presidential Investors Roundtable (PIRT) that advises the president Yoweri Museveni of Uganda, on ways to improve Uganda's investment climate and competitiveness.

Patrick Chalker is a founding member of the Global Leadership Foundation, an organisation which works to support democratic leadership, prevent and resolve conflict through mediation and promote good governance in the form of democratic institutions, open markets, human rights and the rule of law. It does so by making available, discreetly and in confidence, the experience of former leaders to today's national leaders. It is a not-for-profit organisation composed of former heads of government, senior governmental and international organisation officials who work closely with heads of government on governance-related issues of concern to them.

Chalker is a member of the board of trustees of Sentebale, a Charity set-up to reach Lesotho's neediest children, many of whom are the victims of extreme poverty and the HIV/AIDS epidemic of that area. Chalker founded the Chalker Foundation, which seeks to support the improvement of healthcare in Africa.

She held the position of non-executive director and chairman of the Corporate Responsibility and Reputation Committee for Unilever, retiring in May 2007, having served three terms of three years. She joined the board of Unilever as an advisory director in 1998, becoming a non-executive director in 2004. She also served on Africa Advisory Board of Renaissance Capital. 

Chalker is a former chairman of the Medicines for Malaria Venture, a not-for-profit foundation dedicated to reducing the burden of malaria in disease endemic countries. She is a former non-executive director of Group Five (Pty). She was awarded the Livingstone Medal by the Royal Scottish Geographical Society in 2000.

In June 2014, Chalker was awarded honorary citizenship of Mozambique by President Armando Guebuza for services to that country.

Chalker was shortlisted for the Grassroot Diplomat Initiative Award in 2015 for her work with Africa Matters, and she remains in the directory of the Grassroot Diplomat Who's Who publication.

In 2018, it was announced that Chalker would take over from Nicholas Crane as president of the Royal Geographical Society.

Notes

References

External links
 
 Lynda Chalker biodata, qub.ac.uk; accessed 10 August 2014.

1942 births
Living people
Conservative Party (UK) MPs for English constituencies
Chalker of Wallasey
Life peeresses created by Elizabeth II
Unilever people
Female members of the Parliament of the United Kingdom for English constituencies
UK MPs 1974
UK MPs 1974–1979
UK MPs 1979–1983
UK MPs 1983–1987
UK MPs 1987–1992
Members of the Privy Council of the United Kingdom
Presidents of the Royal Geographical Society
People educated at Roedean School, East Sussex
Heidelberg University alumni
Alumni of Queen Mary University of London
Alumni of the University of Westminster
20th-century British women politicians
20th-century English women
20th-century English people
British expatriates in Germany